The Sumba boobook (Ninox rudolfi) is a species of owl in the family Strigidae. It is endemic to Sumba in the Lesser Sunda Islands of Indonesia. Its natural habitats are subtropical or tropical dry forest and subtropical or tropical moist lowland forest. It is threatened by habitat loss.

References

Sumba boobook
Birds of Sumba
Sumba boobook
Taxonomy articles created by Polbot